Prunus fragrans, bugohansol, is a species of Prunus native to the Philippines and Taiwan, and nearby Orchid Island also known as Botel Tobago Island. It is a small tree reaching 15m, although originally described as reaching 30m.

References

fragrans
Flora of the Philippines
Flora of Taiwan
Plants described in 1965